Sphaerichthys is a genus of gouramies native to Southeast Asia known as chocolate gourami.

Species
There are currently four recognized species in this genus:
 Sphaerichthys acrostoma Vierke, 1979 (Giant chocolate gourami)
 Sphaerichthys osphromenoides Canestrini, 1860 (Chocolate gourami)
 Sphaerichthys selatanensis Vierke, 1979 (Crossband chocolate gourami)
 Sphaerichthys vaillanti Pellegrin, 1930 (Valliant's chocolate gourami)

References

Luciocephalinae
Freshwater fish genera
Taxa named by Giovanni Canestrini